Gavin Woods (born 1 March 1978 in Sydney) is an Australian water polo player.  He was a member of Australia's Olympic squad at the 2000, 2004, 2008 and 2012 Summer Olympics. He began his career playing centre-back but switched to centre-forward for the 2004 Olympics.

His father David is a three-time Olympian (1964, 1968 and 1972) and former coach of the Australian women's team (1991–1994), while his sister Taryn and his cousin Bronwyn Mayer were in the women's national team at the Sydney Olympics.

In 2019, he was inducted into the Water Polo Australia Hall of Fame.

See also
 Australia men's Olympic water polo team records and statistics
 List of players who have appeared in multiple men's Olympic water polo tournaments

References

External links
 

1978 births
Living people
Australian male water polo players
Water polo players at the 2000 Summer Olympics
Water polo players at the 2004 Summer Olympics
Water polo players at the 2008 Summer Olympics
Water polo players at the 2012 Summer Olympics
Olympic water polo players of Australia
Water polo players from Sydney